Ian Roberts (born 3 April 1957) is a former Australian rules footballer in the Victorian Football League (VFL) for the Sydney Swans.

Roberts was a supporter of VFL club South Melbourne as a child, and was later recruited to Souths from Frankston. He made his VFL debut with Souths in 1979 and made his name as a back pocket player as they relocated from Melbourne to Sydney in 1982. 

In a long career with the Swans spanning 13 seasons, Roberts played 157 games and kicked 33 goals, retiring at the end of 1991. He missed many games due to injury, as his light 73 kg frame and uncompromising playing style.

References

External links

Sydney Swans players
Frankston Football Club players
Australian rules footballers from Victoria (Australia)
1957 births
Living people